In mathematics, Gabriel's theorem, proved by Pierre Gabriel,  classifies the quivers of finite type in terms of Dynkin diagrams.

Statement

A quiver is of finite type if it has only finitely many isomorphism classes of indecomposable representations.  classified all quivers of finite type, and also their indecomposable representations. More precisely, Gabriel's theorem states that:

 The indecomposable representations are in a one-to-one correspondence with the positive roots of the root system of the Dynkin diagram.

 found a generalization of Gabriel's theorem in which all Dynkin diagrams of finite-dimensional semisimple Lie algebras occur.

References

Theorems in representation theory